El Puente, meaning "The Bridge" in Spanish, may refer to:
El Puente, Cantabria, capital of the municipality of Guriezo, Cantabria, Spain
El Puente (Guarayos), a municipality in Santa Cruz, Bolivia
El Puente del Arzobispo, a municipality in the province of Toledo, Castile-La Mancha, Spain
El Puente (Maya site), a Maya archaeological site in the department of Copán in Honduras
El Puente Academy for Peace and Justice, a public high school in Williamsburg, Brooklyn, New York City
El Puente del Papa, a bridge in Monterrey, Nuevo León, Mexico
El Puente (coalition), a grassroots environmental justice coalition located in the towns of Williamsburg and Greenpoint, Brooklyn, New York

Other uses
El Puente (TV series), a Spanish reality television series.

See also
Puente (disambiguation)